Irun Ficoba is a railway station in Irun, Basque Country, Spain. It is owned by Euskal Trenbide Sarea and operated by Euskotren. It lies on the San Sebastián-Hendaye railway, popularly known as the Topo line.

History 
The station opened in 1913 as part of the Irun-Hendaye stretch of the San Sebastián-Hendaye railway. The station, originally known as), was built as a border facility. The platform was divided by a fence: passengers had to get off the train in the first half of the platform, clear the customs, and board the train again in the second half. The customs and border facilities have since been closed, and in 2010 the station acquired its present name.

Services 
The station is served by Euskotren Trena line E2. It runs every 30 minutes throughout the week.

References

External links
 

Euskotren Trena stations
Railway stations in Spain opened in 1913
France–Spain border crossings
Irun